The Plaza Apartments are a historic residential building at 610 Spring Street in Hot Springs, Arkansas.  It is a two-story wood-frame structure, with a front-facing gable roof, stuccoed exterior, and a single-story gabled front porch.  The stucco has been painted to resemble stone blocks.  The roof eaves are decorated with large Craftsman style brackets.  The building was constructed about 1915 as a rooming house, and is a good local example of Craftsman styling.  The building's interior has also retained significant period woodwork, including trim, doors, and stairs.

The building was listed on the National Register of Historic Places in 1999.

See also
National Register of Historic Places listings in Garland County, Arkansas

References

Residential buildings completed in 1915
National Register of Historic Places in Hot Springs, Arkansas
Apartment buildings on the National Register of Historic Places in Arkansas
1915 establishments in Arkansas
American Craftsman architecture in Arkansas